Senneville is an affluent on-island suburban village on the western tip of the Island of Montreal, Quebec, Canada. It is the wealthiest town in the West Island.

Situated close to the city of Montreal, it was historically a popular location for the country houses of wealthy Montrealers.  Attractions include multiple golf clubs, a yacht club, and La Ferme du Fort Senneville, an organic demonstration farm.  The Morgan Arboretum was founded here in 1953, and is today managed by Macdonald College; an important bird sanctuary, it is open to the public year-round.  Fort Senneville was constructed here in 1671, but its ruins are on private land and are not accessible to the public.  The historic core of the village was designated a National Historic Site of Canada in 2002.

Geography

All of Senneville lies over dolomite. In contrast to the monotony of this bedrock, there are many types of soil in the municipality. Clay is common near the northeastern corner and part of the western shores. Sand dominates many inland areas; it is rapidly drained in places but often has impeded drainage due to the type of hardpan which develops in podzols. Near-shore areas along the northern margin have extensive areas of glacial till which forms a calcareous well-drained loam.

The loamy slopes overlooking Lake of Two Mountains are excellent for fruit trees and tender plants due to fertile soils, good drainage, and the moderating effect on microclimate provided by the lake.

History

Because of its strategic location at the far western end of Montreal Island, a stockade fort was built there in 1671.

In 1679, Jacques Le Ber, fur trader from Montreal, bought the Boisbriand Fief from Michel Sidrac Dugé, and renamed it to Senneville after Senneville-sur-Fécamp, his hometown in France. Le Ber operated a fur trading post there and built a stone windmill at the fort in 1686, which also served as a focal point for settlers in the area.

In 1689, the Battle of the Lake of Two Mountains took place nearby.

1n 1691, the stockade and windmill were burned down by Iroquois and a new stone fort was constructed in 1702-1703, which lasted until 1776 when it was destroyed during the American Revolutionary War by Continental Army troops under Benedict Arnold.

The Village Municipality of Senneville was established on January 12, 1895, when it separated from the Parish of Sainte-Anne du Bout-de-l’Isle. The Senneville Post Office operated from 1911 to 1957.

On January 1, 2002, as part of the 2002–2006 municipal reorganization of Montreal, Senneville was merged into the city of Montreal and became part of the borough of Pierrefonds-Senneville. However, after a change of government and a 2004 referendum, it was re-constituted as an independent village municipality on January 1, 2006.

Demographics 

Government

The current mayor of the Village of Senneville is Julie Brisebois.

In addition, there are six municipal councillors:
François Vaqué (District 1)
Alain Savoie (District 2)
Christopher Jackson (District 3)
Michelle Jackson Trepanier (District 4)
Dennis Dicks (District 5)
Peter Csenar (District 6)

Former mayors
List of former mayors:

 Louis-Joseph Forget (1896–1911)
 Frederic Lumb Wanklyn (1911–1914)
 Guy Boyer (1914–1915)
 Frederick Cleveland Morgan (1915–1919)
 John Lancelot Todd (1919–1920)
 R. MacD. Paterson (1920–1922)
 George M. Bosworth (1922–1925)
 Robert R. Macaulay (1925–1930)
 William A. Fallis (1930–1933)
 John Y. Phillips (1933–1935)
 William George M. Stuart (1935–1936)
 Thomas Arnold (1936–1937, 1939–1943)
 Joseph Davison Weir (1937–1939)
 Guy Mansfield Todd (1943–1947)
 Luther H. D. Sutherland (1947–1951)
 Adélard Raymond (1951–1959)
 Edward R. Smallhorn (1959–1967)
 Bernard Whittaker Burgess (1967–1975)
 Cameron F. Duff (1975–1986)
 Ovila Crevier (1986–1995)
 George MacLeish (1995–2002, 2006–2013)
 Jane Foukai (Guest (2013–2017)
 Julie Brisebois (2017–present)

Education
The Centre de services scolaire Marguerite-Bourgeoys operates Francophone public schools, but were previously operated by the Commission scolaire Marguerite-Bourgeoys until June 15, 2020. The change was a result of a law passed by the Quebec government that changed the school board system from denominational to linguistic. It operates the École secondaire Saint-Georges.

The Lester B. Pearson School Board (LBPSB) operates Anglophone public schools in the area.
 The zoned elementary school is Dorset Elementary School in Baie-D'Urfé

Notable residents
Notable past and present residents include:
 Ken Dryden,  politician, lawyer, businessman, author, and former NHL goalie
 Corey Hart, singer-songwriter
 Janina Fialkowska, classical pianist
 Christopher Plummer, stage, film, and television actor
 Lino Saputo, founder of the Canadian cheese manufacturer Saputo Inc.

See also
 List of former boroughs
 Montreal Merger
 Municipal reorganization in Quebec

References

External links 

 
 Gordon & Gotch's 1924 Map of the Island of Montreal
 Senneville is named on this map

 
Villages in Quebec
Island of Montreal municipalities
West Island
Populated places established in 1679